Émile-Louis-Gustave Deshayes de Marcère (16 March 1828 – 26 April 1918) was a French politician.

Marcère was a deputy in the National Assembly from 1871 to 1884. In 1876 and 1878, he was Minister of the Interior, continuing in post for a few weeks in the Waddington ministry of 1879.

In 1884, Marcère was appointed as a senator for life (sénateur inamovible). He was mayor of Messei from 1892 to 1912, where he died in 1918. At his death he was the last surviving senator for life of the Third Republic.

External links
Fonds Emile de Marcère—details on the papers at the French National Archives.

1828 births
1918 deaths
People from Orne
Politicians from Normandy
Opportunist Republicans
French interior ministers
Members of the National Assembly (1871)
Members of the 1st Chamber of Deputies of the French Third Republic
Members of the 2nd Chamber of Deputies of the French Third Republic
Members of the 3rd Chamber of Deputies of the French Third Republic
French life senators